The Karachay-Cherkessia constituency (No.16) is a Russian legislative constituency covering the entirety of Karachay-Cherkessia.

Members elected

Election results

1993

|-
! colspan=2 style="background-color:#E9E9E9;text-align:left;vertical-align:top;" |Candidate
! style="background-color:#E9E9E9;text-align:left;vertical-align:top;" |Party
! style="background-color:#E9E9E9;text-align:right;" |Votes
! style="background-color:#E9E9E9;text-align:right;" |%
|-
|style="background-color:"|
|align=left|Azret Akbayev
|align=left|Independent
|
|39.09%
|-
|style="background-color:"|
|align=left|Aleksandr Kobanov
|align=left|Independent
| -
|27.30%
|-
| colspan="5" style="background-color:#E9E9E9;"|
|- style="font-weight:bold"
| colspan="3" style="text-align:left;" | Total
| 
| 100%
|-
| colspan="5" style="background-color:#E9E9E9;"|
|- style="font-weight:bold"
| colspan="4" |Source:
|
|}

1995

|-
! colspan=2 style="background-color:#E9E9E9;text-align:left;vertical-align:top;" |Candidate
! style="background-color:#E9E9E9;text-align:left;vertical-align:top;" |Party
! style="background-color:#E9E9E9;text-align:right;" |Votes
! style="background-color:#E9E9E9;text-align:right;" |%
|-
|style="background-color:"|
|align=left|Mikhail Yakush
|align=left|Communist Party
|
|31.54%
|-
|style="background-color:"|
|align=left|Akhmed Kitov
|align=left|Our Home – Russia
|
|14.11%
|-
|style="background-color:"|
|align=left|Vladimir Strigin
|align=left|Independent
|
|8.68%
|-
|style="background-color:#959698"|
|align=left|Emma Kardanova
|align=left|Derzhava
|
|7.75%
|-
|style="background-color:"|
|align=left|Ismail Aliyev
|align=left|Independent
|
|5.16%
|-
|style="background-color:"|
|align=left|Abubakir Tambiyev
|align=left|Independent
|
|3.82%
|-
|style="background-color:"|
|align=left|Vladimir Davydov
|align=left|Liberal Democratic Party
|
|3.47%
|-
|style="background-color:#F21A29"|
|align=left|Aleksandr Kobanov
|align=left|Trade Unions and Industrialists – Union of Labour
|
|3.09%
|-
|style="background-color:"|
|align=left|Pyotr Pleshennikov
|align=left|Independent
|
|2.85%
|-
|style="background-color:"|
|align=left|Khasan Bayramukov
|align=left|Agrarian Party
|
|2.66%
|-
|style="background-color:"|
|align=left|Anatoly Khaldzhiyev
|align=left|Independent
|
|2.05%
|-
|style="background-color:#265BAB"|
|align=left|Rashid Teunayev
|align=left|Russian Lawyers' Association
|
|1.68%
|-
|style="background-color:#DA2021"|
|align=left|Azret Akbayev (incumbent)
|align=left|Ivan Rybkin Bloc
|
|1.39%
|-
|style="background-color:#F5821F"|
|align=left|Nikolay Zalepukhin
|align=left|Bloc of Independents
|
|1.19%
|-
|style="background-color:"|
|align=left|Alimurat Tekeyev
|align=left|Independent
|
|1.07%
|-
|style="background-color:#FE4801"|
|align=left|Alik Chotchayev
|align=left|Pamfilova–Gurov–Lysenko
|
|0.68%
|-
|style="background-color:"|
|align=left|Dalkhat Sultanov
|align=left|Independent
|
|0.62%
|-
|style="background-color:"|
|align=left|Aiguf Kubanov
|align=left|Independent
|
|0.59%
|-
|style="background-color:#3A46CE"|
|align=left|Asiyat Khabicheva
|align=left|Democratic Choice of Russia – United Democrats
|
|0.59%
|-
|style="background-color:"|
|align=left|Nazir Alakayev
|align=left|Independent
|
|0.42%
|-
|style="background-color:"|
|align=left|Mussa Abaikhanov
|align=left|Independent
|
|0.37%
|-
|style="background-color:"|
|align=left|Pilyal Khasanov
|align=left|Independent
|
|0.34%
|-
|style="background-color:"|
|align=left|Magomet Bytdayev
|align=left|Independent
|
|0.26%
|-
|style="background-color:#000000"|
|colspan=2 |against all
|
|3.13%
|-
| colspan="5" style="background-color:#E9E9E9;"|
|- style="font-weight:bold"
| colspan="3" style="text-align:left;" | Total
| 
| 100%
|-
| colspan="5" style="background-color:#E9E9E9;"|
|- style="font-weight:bold"
| colspan="4" |Source:
|
|}

1999

|-
! colspan=2 style="background-color:#E9E9E9;text-align:left;vertical-align:top;" |Candidate
! style="background-color:#E9E9E9;text-align:left;vertical-align:top;" |Party
! style="background-color:#E9E9E9;text-align:right;" |Votes
! style="background-color:#E9E9E9;text-align:right;" |%
|-
|style="background-color:"|
|align=left|Boris Berezovsky
|align=left|Independent
|
|40.95%
|-
|style="background-color:"|
|align=left|Muratkhan Mikhailovich
|align=left|Communist Party
|
|23.97%
|-
|style="background-color:"|
|align=left|Ruslan Kochkarov
|align=left|Independent
|
|6.40%
|-
|style="background-color:#C21022"|
|align=left|Magomed Borlakov
|align=left|Party of Pensioners
|
|5.38%
|-
|style="background-color:#3B9EDF"|
|align=left|Emma Kardanova
|align=left|Fatherland – All Russia
|
|4.70%
|-
|style="background-color:"|
|align=left|Yury Krivobokov
|align=left|Our Home – Russia
|
|3.94%
|-
|style="background-color:"|
|align=left|Vladimir Malykhin
|align=left|Yabloko
|
|3.40%
|-
|style="background-color:"|
|align=left|Vladimir Davydov
|align=left|Liberal Democratic Party
|
|2.47%
|-
|style="background-color:"|
|align=left|Ansar Tebuyev
|align=left|Independent
|
|0.93%
|-
|style="background-color:#084284"|
|align=left|Leonid Kaplin
|align=left|Spiritual Heritage
|
|0.92%
|-
|style="background-color:"|
|align=left|Bailyk Shidakov
|align=left|Independent
|
|0.47%
|-
|style="background-color:#000000"|
|colspan=2 |against all
|
|4.25%
|-
| colspan="5" style="background-color:#E9E9E9;"|
|- style="font-weight:bold"
| colspan="3" style="text-align:left;" | Total
| 
| 100%
|-
| colspan="5" style="background-color:#E9E9E9;"|
|- style="font-weight:bold"
| colspan="4" |Source:
|
|}

2000

|-
! colspan=2 style="background-color:#E9E9E9;text-align:left;vertical-align:top;" |Candidate
! style="background-color:#E9E9E9;text-align:left;vertical-align:top;" |Party
! style="background-color:#E9E9E9;text-align:right;" |Votes
! style="background-color:#E9E9E9;text-align:right;" |%
|-
|style="background-color:"|
|align=left|Magomet Tekeyev
|align=left|Independent
|
|29.32%
|-
|style="background-color:"|
|align=left|Vasily Neshchadimov
|align=left|Independent
|
|28.07%
|-
|style="background-color:"|
|align=left|Muratkhan Mikhailovich
|align=left|Communist Party
|
|22.58%
|-
|style="background-color:"|
|align=left|Emma Kardanova
|align=left|Independent
|
|7.71%
|-
|style="background-color:"|
|align=left|Vladimir Poluboyarenko
|align=left|Independent
|
|5.18%
|-
|style="background-color:"|
|align=left|Vladimir Panov
|align=left|Independent
|
|1.53%
|-
|style="background-color:"|
|align=left|Baidymat Kicherukova
|align=left|Independent
|
|0.67%
|-
|style="background-color:#000000"|
|colspan=2 |against all
|
|2.81%
|-
| colspan="5" style="background-color:#E9E9E9;"|
|- style="font-weight:bold"
| colspan="3" style="text-align:left;" | Total
| 
| 100%
|-
| colspan="5" style="background-color:#E9E9E9;"|
|- style="font-weight:bold"
| colspan="4" |Source:
|
|}

2003

|-
! colspan=2 style="background-color:#E9E9E9;text-align:left;vertical-align:top;" |Candidate
! style="background-color:#E9E9E9;text-align:left;vertical-align:top;" |Party
! style="background-color:#E9E9E9;text-align:right;" |Votes
! style="background-color:#E9E9E9;text-align:right;" |%
|-
|style="background-color:"|
|align=left|Nadezhda Maksimova
|align=left|United Russia
|
|50.78%
|-
|style="background-color:"|
|align=left|Muratkhan Mikhailovich
|align=left|Communist Party
|
|8.37%
|-
|style="background-color:"|
|align=left|Boris Batchayev
|align=left|Independent
|
|6.54%
|-
|style="background-color:"|
|align=left|Igor Timofeyev
|align=left|Independent
|
|4.39%
|-
|style="background-color:"|
|align=left|Sagit Khubiyev
|align=left|Independent
|
|4.32%
|-
|style="background-color:"|
|align=left|Magomet Tekeyev (incumbent)
|align=left|Independent
|
|3.51%
|-
|style="background-color:"|
|align=left|Osman Botashev
|align=left|Independent
|
|2.92%
|-
|style="background-color:"|
|align=left|Zagirat Dzhegutanova
|align=left|Independent
|
|1.58%
|-
|style="background-color:#FFD700"|
|align=left|Alimurat Tekeyev
|align=left|People's Party
|
|1.50%
|-
|style="background-color:#C21022"|
|align=left|Fyodor Ferisov
|align=left|Russian Pensioners' Party-Party of Social Justice
|
|1.42%
|-
|style="background-color:"|
|align=left|Vladimir Grinko
|align=left|Independent
|
|0.98%
|-
|style="background-color:#7C73CC"|
|align=left|Oleg Kodzhakov
|align=left|Great Russia–Eurasian Union
|
|0.72%
|-
|style="background-color:"|
|align=left|Azret Akbayev
|align=left|Independent
|
|0.54%
|-
|style="background-color:#DBB726"|
|align=left|Yevgeny Shramko
|align=left|Democratic Party
|
|0.53%
|-
|style="background-color:"|
|align=left|Viktor Skorikov
|align=left|Independent
|
|0.50%
|-
|style="background-color:"|
|align=left|Azret-Ali Dzhukayev
|align=left|Independent
|
|0.42%
|-
|style="background-color:#164C8C"|
|align=left|Anatoly Bogdanov
|align=left|United Russian Party Rus'
|
|0.41%
|-
|style="background-color:#7B746F"|
|align=left|Andrey Gudimov
|align=left|People's Republican Party
|
|0.37%
|-
|style="background-color:"|
|align=left|Shagaban Totorkulov
|align=left|Independent
|
|0.31%
|-
|style="background-color:#1042A5"|
|align=left|Asiyat Khabicheva
|align=left|Union of Right Forces
|
|0.31%
|-
|style="background-color:"|
|align=left|Khalit Bairamkulov
|align=left|Independent
|
|0.30%
|-
|style="background-color:"|
|align=left|Fatima Dzhogan
|align=left|Rodina
|
|0.28%
|-
|style="background-color:#000000"|
|colspan=2 |against all
|
|3.35%
|-
| colspan="5" style="background-color:#E9E9E9;"|
|- style="font-weight:bold"
| colspan="3" style="text-align:left;" | Total
| 
| 100%
|-
| colspan="5" style="background-color:#E9E9E9;"|
|- style="font-weight:bold"
| colspan="4" |Source:
|
|}

2016

|-
! colspan=2 style="background-color:#E9E9E9;text-align:left;vertical-align:top;" |Candidate
! style="background-color:#E9E9E9;text-align:leftt;vertical-align:top;" |Party
! style="background-color:#E9E9E9;text-align:right;" |Votes
! style="background-color:#E9E9E9;text-align:right;" |%
|-
|style="background-color:"|
|align=left|Rasul Botashev
|align=left|United Russia
|
|53.03%
|-
|style="background-color: " |
|align=left|Eduard Marshankulov
|align=left|Communists of Russia
|
|25.02%
|-
|style="background-color:"|
|align=left|Kemal Bytdayev
|align=left|Communist Party
|
|6.88%
|-
|style="background-color:"|
|align=left|Oleg Kodzhakov
|align=left|Patriots of Russia
|
|3.09%
|-
|style="background:"| 
|align=left|Valery Ayubov
|align=left|A Just Russia
|
|2.89%
|-
|style="background-color:"|
|align=left|Muradin Dzhantemirov
|align=left|The Greens
|
|2.79%
|-
|style="background:"| 
|align=left|Inna Nasheva
|align=left|Party of Growth
|
|2.49%
|-
|style="background:"| 
|align=left|Akhmed Abazov
|align=left|Yabloko
|
|2.09%
|-
|style="background-color:"|
|align=left|Alim Kasayev
|align=left|Liberal Democratic Party
|
|1.50%
|-
| colspan="5" style="background-color:#E9E9E9;"|
|- style="font-weight:bold"
| colspan="3" style="text-align:left;" | Total
| 
| 100%
|-
| colspan="5" style="background-color:#E9E9E9;"|
|- style="font-weight:bold"
| colspan="4" |Source:
|
|}

2021

|-
! colspan=2 style="background-color:#E9E9E9;text-align:left;vertical-align:top;" |Candidate
! style="background-color:#E9E9E9;text-align:left;vertical-align:top;" |Party
! style="background-color:#E9E9E9;text-align:right;" |Votes
! style="background-color:#E9E9E9;text-align:right;" |%
|-
|style="background-color:"|
|align=left|Dzhasharbek Uzdenov
|align=left|United Russia
|
|78.60%
|-
|style="background-color:"|
|align=left|Kemal Bytdayev
|align=left|Communist Party
|
|10.79%
|-
|style="background-color:"|
|align=left|Oleg Zhedyayev
|align=left|Liberal Democratic Party
|
|4.09%
|-
|style="background-color: " |
|align=left|Azamat Dudov
|align=left|A Just Russia — For Truth
|
|2.28%
|-
|style="background-color: " |
|align=left|Zaur Tekeyev
|align=left|Communists of Russia
|
|1.34%
|-
|style="background-color:"|
|align=left|Muradin Dzhantemirov
|align=left|The Greens
|
|1.25%
|-
|style="background-color:"|
|align=left|Sharifutdin Bostanov
|align=left|New People
|
|0.73%
|-
|style="background:"| 
|align=left|Akhmed Abazov
|align=left|Yabloko
|
|0.51%
|-
| colspan="5" style="background-color:#E9E9E9;"|
|- style="font-weight:bold"
| colspan="3" style="text-align:left;" | Total
| 
| 100%
|-
| colspan="5" style="background-color:#E9E9E9;"|
|- style="font-weight:bold"
| colspan="4" |Source:
|
|}

Notes

References

Russian legislative constituencies
Politics of Karachay-Cherkessia